Human Organization is the peer-reviewed research journal of the Society for Applied Anthropology. Published quarterly since 1941, it is the second-longest continuously published journal in cultural anthropology in the United States. Its primary objective is to analyze practical human problems through the application of anthropological theory and data. The journal regularly features articles on human rights, public health and medical care, and indigenous knowledge and management of natural resources.

Since 2015 Human Organization has been edited by anthropologist Sarah Lyon, associate professor at the University of Kentucky, in Lexington; her term is scheduled to run until December 2018. Lyon's immediate predecessor as editor-in-chief was anthropologist Mark Moberg, professor at the University of South Alabama, in Mobile, who held the post from 2011 to 2014. Current editors are Nancy Romero-Daza (professor) and David Himmelgreen (chair and professor) from the University of South Florida in Tampa.

References

External links
Human Organization

Anthropology journals
Multidisciplinary social science journals